The second inauguration of Franklin D. Roosevelt as president of the United States was held on Wednesday, January 20, 1937, at the East Portico of the United States Capitol in Washington, D.C. This was the 38th presidential inauguration and marked the commencement of the second term of Franklin D. Roosevelt as president and John Nance Garner as vice president. It was the first inauguration to take place on January 20 per the 20th Amendment to the U.S. Constitution. This was also the first time the vice president took the oath of office on the inaugural platform rather than in the Senate Chamber. The length of Roosevelt's term as president, and Garner's as vice president had already been shortened by  days.

It rained all morning and during the inauguration; the crowds hastily dispersed once it was over.

See also
Presidency of Franklin D. Roosevelt
First inauguration of Franklin D. Roosevelt
Third inauguration of Franklin D. Roosevelt
Fourth inauguration of Franklin D. Roosevelt
1936 United States presidential election

References

External links
Video of FDR's second inauguration from British Pathe (via YouTube)
Text of Roosevelt's Second Inaugural Address
Audio of Roosevelt's Second Inaugural Address (via YouTube)

Roosevelt, Franklin 1937
Inauguration 1937
Roosevelt inaug
Roosevelt inaug
January 1937 events